Torsk may refer to:

 The Danish, Norwegian and Swedish word for cod and Atlantic cod
 A common name for cusk (fish),
 USS Torsk (SS-423), an American submarine; built 1944, since 1972 a floating museum